Ian Tracey Benjamin (born 11 December 1961) is an English former professional footballer who made nearly 500 appearances in the Football League between 1979 and 1994, playing primarily as a forward.

Career
Benjamin joined Sheffield United as a youngster and then made a move to West Bromwich Albion for £100,000. Whilst a West Bromwich Albion player he played in a benefit match for Len Cantello, that saw a team of white players play against a team of black players.

He struggled in his early days and it was not until he joined Peterborough United that he became a first team regular. He then joined the Cobblers, and after a spell in midfield, he moved up front and won the player of the year award. He fitted in well with Graham Carr's side, but he later lost his place as the manager believed he had better options available for Northampton. Benjamin later joined a number of clubs. He helped Southend United to promotion and was responsible for putting the ball in the Bury net, but was with Luton Town when they were relegated. In 1996 he dropped into non-League, signing for Chelmsford City and later Bury Town.

His first managerial job was at Corby Town in the late 1990s. He then managed Warboys Town, while working part-time for the Royal Mail postal service, before joining Soham Town Rangers as a player, later becoming joint manager in May 2001. In January 2002 Benjamin was appointed manager of Wisbech Town.

He returned to Soham Town Rangers at the start of the 2005–06 season and led the club to their first Eastern Counties League title in 2007–08, earning promotion to the Southern League. He left Soham in 2011, after which he worked as a youth coach for Northampton Town and for Swindon Town as a scout.

In June 2015 he was appointed manager of Yaxley, with Andy Furnell as his assistant. However, on 31 March 2016 Benjamin resigned as Yaxley manager, stating 'I didn't feel all the committee were behind me'. In June 2016 he became manager of Stewarts & Lloyds Corby, where he remained in post until resigning in December 2017.

Honours

Northampton Town

 Player of the Season: 1986-87

References

External links

Cobblers Greats Profile

1961 births
Living people
Footballers from Nottingham
English Football League players
English footballers
Sheffield United F.C. players
West Bromwich Albion F.C. players
Peterborough United F.C. players
Northampton Town F.C. players
Cambridge United F.C. players
Chester City F.C. players
Exeter City F.C. players
Southend United F.C. players
Luton Town F.C. players
Brentford F.C. players
Wigan Athletic F.C. players
Chelmsford City F.C. players
Bury Town F.C. players
Soham Town Rangers F.C. players
England youth international footballers
Notts County F.C. players
Black British sportspeople
English football managers
Warboys Town F.C. managers
Wisbech Town F.C. managers
Corby Town F.C. managers
Soham Town Rangers F.C. managers
Yaxley F.C. managers
Stewarts & Lloyds Corby A.F.C. managers
Association football forwards
Northampton Town F.C. non-playing staff
Swindon Town F.C. non-playing staff
Association football coaches
Association football scouts